Astrophocaudia (meaning "non-twisting tail"; alternately "star tail" in reference to Astrodon) is a genus of somphospondylan sauropod known from the late Early Cretaceous (Albian stage) of Texas, United States. Its remains were discovered in the Trinity Group. The type species is Astrophocaudia slaughteri, described in 2012 by Michael D. D’Emic while a doctoral student at the Museum of Paleontology of the University of Michigan, USA.

Discovery and naming
In 1969, Maria A. Marques-Bilelo reported the holotype from the Trinity Group. In 1974, Wann Langston Jr. referred the fossil to Pleurocoelus (now considered a junior synonym of Astrodon) as a Pleurocoelus sp. In 2012, Michael D'Emic renamed Pleurocoelus sp. as Astrophocaudia slaughteri in his redescription of the Trinity Group sauropods.

The holotype is a partial skeleton including a tooth, two neck vertebrae, fragments of back vertebrae, 24 tail vertebrae, approximately 20 fragmentary ribs, two chevrons, and a piece of shoulder blade.

References

Early Cretaceous dinosaurs of North America
Fossil taxa described in 2012
Macronarians
Paleontology in Texas